Jesse Jones may refer to:
Jesse S. Jones (1860–1931), American politician
Jesse H. Jones (1874–1956), American politician and entrepreneur
Jesse Jones (judoka) (1936–2014), American judoka
Jesse Fuller Jones (fl. 19th century), owner of Jesse Fuller Jones House, a historic plantation house in North Carolina
Jesse D. Jones (fl. 1940s), commander of the USS Henry County
Jesse Benjamin Jones, composer, winner of the Charles Ives Prize
Jesse Jones, a character in Universal Soldier

See also
Jesse H. Jones High School
Jesse H. Jones Graduate School of Business
Jessica Jones (disambiguation)
Jones Hall, or Jesse H. Jones Hall for the Performing Arts